Northridge High School is a public high school in Tuscaloosa, Alabama, United States, enrolling just over 1000 students in grades 9–12 as of spring 2021. It is one of three high schools in the Tuscaloosa City School District. It offers technical and academic programs, as well as joint enrollment with Shelton State Community College and the University of Alabama. Northridge High School is accredited by the Southern Association of Colleges and Schools.

Founded in 2003, Northridge is one of the two youngest public high schools in Tuscaloosa. After the retirement of Central High School East, the Tuscaloosa City School system divided the city into three schools: Northridge High School, Paul W. Bryant High School (both of which were opened in 2003), and Central High School. Northridge High School is located on the north side of the Black Warrior River on Northridge Road.

Academics

Profile

56% of Northridge High's enrollment is African American, 3% is of Asian descent, 40% is of European descent, and the remainder is mostly Hispanic.

Northridge offers the most AP Classes in Tuscaloosa County.

History
On average, four Northridge High students earn the National Merit Finalist Cy Young status each year.

Exchange students 
Northridge is a hospital school for students all over the world. In 2010 Northridge hosted students from Russia, Ukraine, Georgia, Mozambique, Kenya, North Korea, Kazakhstan, and Germany.

Athletics 

The nickname for Northridge sports team is the "Northridge Jaguars." Their official mascots are "Mic Jaguar" and "Maggie the Jaggie". The school is a 6A school in the Alabama High School Athletic Association (AHSAA).

Football 

In their 2011 season the Northridge Jaguars finished with a 10-2 record, the best record in school history, moving on to the second round of the Alabama 6A playoffs.

Notable alumni include Vinnie Sunseri, NFL safety with New England Patriots; and Malcolm Johnson, NFL fullback for Cleveland Browns.

Baseball 
The Northridge baseball team has had four consecutive 20+ win seasons. The Jags won the area championship in 2012 for the first time in school history.

Soccer 
The school has a freshman boys' team, junior varsity boys' team, varsity boys' team, freshman girls' team, junior varsity girls' team, and a varsity girls' team. In 2015, The varsity girls' team competed in the Final Four and came in 3rd in the state. In 2016, both varsity teams traveled to Huntsville, with the boys coming 3rd in the state and the girls competing in the finals. The varsity girls' team came second in the state. The soccer teams have competed in more playoff games than any other sport.

Golf 
Notable alumni include Patton Kizzire, Auburn University and current PGA golfer.

Tennis 
The Northridge varsity girls' team won the 6A state championship in 2018. The Northridge varsity boys’ team won the 6A state championship in 2022.

Notable alumni 
 Malcolm Johnson, NFL fullback
 Bo Scarbrough, NFL running back; transferred before his senior season
 Vinnie Sunseri, former NFL safety, current NFL coach
 Patton Kizzire, multiple winner on PGA Tour

References 

High schools in Tuscaloosa, Alabama
Educational institutions established in 2003
Public high schools in Alabama
2003 establishments in Alabama